The 1984 NCAA Division I baseball tournament was played at the end of the 1984 NCAA Division I baseball season to determine the national champion of college baseball.  The tournament concluded with eight teams competing in the College World Series, a double-elimination tournament in its thirty eighth year.  Eight regional competitions were held to determine the participants in the final event.  Six regions held a four team, double-elimination tournament while two regions included six teams, resulting in 36 teams participating in the tournament at the conclusion of their regular season, and in some cases, after a conference tournament.  The thirty-eighth tournament's champion was Cal State Fullerton, coached by Augie Garrido.  The Most Outstanding Player was John Fishel of Cal State Fullerton.

National seeds
Bold indicates CWS participant.
Arizona State
Cal State Fullerton
North Carolina
Oklahoma State
Texas

Regionals
The opening rounds of the tournament were played across eight regional sites across the country, six consisting of four teams and two of six teams. The winners of each Regional advanced to the College World Series.

Bold indicates winner.

Central Regional at Austin, TX

Mideast Regional at Mt. Pleasant, MI

Midwest Regional at Stillwater, OK

Northeast Regional at Orono, ME

South I Regional at Tallahassee, FL

South II Regional at Starkville, MS

West I Regional at Fresno, CA

West II Regional at Tempe, AZ

College World Series

Participants

Results

Bracket

Game results

All-Tournament Team
The following players were members of the All-Tournament Team.

Notable players
 Arizona State: Chris Beasley, Barry Bonds, Mike Devereaux, Shawn Gilbert, Doug Henry, Oddibe McDowell, Luis Medina, Don Wakamatsu
 Cal State Fullerton: John Fishel, Greg Mathews, José Mota, Shane Turner
 Maine: Mike Bordick, Bill Swift
 Michigan: Scott Kamieniecki, Barry Larkin, Hal Morris, Gary Wayne
 New Orleans: Jim Bullinger, Mark Higgins, Wally Whitehurst
 Oklahoma State: Jeff Bronkey, Doug Dascenzo, Carlos Diaz, John Farrell, Gary Green, Mike Henneman, Pete Incaviglia
 Texas: Billy Bates, Dennis Cook, Rusty Richards, Bruce Ruffin, Greg Swindell

Tournament Notes
Gary Green and Bill Swift appear in their fourth College World Series. Michigan's appearance was the last for the Big Ten until 2013 when Indiana made the College World Series.

See also
 1984 NCAA Division I softball tournament
 1984 NCAA Division II baseball tournament
 1984 NCAA Division III baseball tournament
 1984 NAIA World Series

References

NCAA Division I Baseball Championship
1984 NCAA Division I baseball season
Baseball in Austin, Texas